The whitemargin moray or the white-edged moray, Gymnothorax albimarginatus, is a species of marine fish in the family Muraenidae.

Description
The whitemargin moray is considered as a medium-sized fish which can reach 105 cm long. Its snout is rounded. Its body coloration can vary off-white to beige with a characteristic white margin on the outer edge of the dorsal fin that runs through its body from the back of the skull to the tip of the tail.

Distribution & habitat
The whitemargin moray is widespread throughout the tropical waters of Indo-Pacific area from the eastern part of Indonesia to the oceanic islands in the Ocean Pacific, including Hawaii and Polynesia; and from South Japan down to Tonga Islands.

This moray lives on the sandy slopes of the coastal reefs.

Biology
The whitemargin moray is a benthic animal that lives during daytime buried in the sand or between coral blocs and comes out the evening to hunt prey.
Its bite is venomous.

References

External links
http://www.marinespecies.org/aphia.php?p=taxdetails&id=271814
http://www.fishbase.org/summary/52889#
http://www.itis.gov/servlet/SingleRpt/SingleRpt?search_topic=TSN&search_value=635992
http://eol.org/pages/208952/details

albimarginatus
Fish of Hawaii
Fish described in 1846